Universidad Católica Boliviana "San Pablo" is the official name of the Catholic University of Bolivia. This private university is the oldest in Bolivia that does not receive economical budget of Government. Established in La Paz in 1963 and active since 1966, the university now has four regional units in La Paz, Cochabamba, Tarija and Santa Cruz de la Sierra.

Mission 
The fundamental mission of the Bolivian Catholic University "San Pablo" is the constant search for truth through research, conservation and communication of the saber for the good of society. The Bolivian Catholic University “San Pablo” participates in this mission, contributing its specific characteristics and purpose.

Through teaching and research, the Bolivian Catholic University "San Pablo" makes an indispensable contribution to the Church. It prepares men and women who, inspired by Christian principles and motivated to live their Christian vocation with maturity and coherence, may also be able to assume positions of responsibility in society and in the Church. In addition, thanks to the results of scientific research that can make a provision, they can help the Church respond to the problems and demands of each historical moment.

Notable alumni 

 Rosmery Mollo - reproductive health activist.

References

Universities in Bolivia
Educational institutions established in 1963
1963 establishments in Bolivia